Mateusz Banasiuk (born 21 September 1985) is a Polish actor. He has appeared in more than 16 films since 2004.

Selected filmography

References

External links
 

1985 births
Living people
Male actors from Warsaw
Polish male film actors
Polish male television actors
21st-century Polish male actors